N-Toon was an R&B group from Atlanta created by former Klymaxx frontwoman Joyce Irby in 1996. The group consisted of Lloyd Polite, Justin Clark, Everett Hall and Chuckie D. Reynolds. The group disbanded in 2001.

Toon Time was released on DreamWorks in March 2000. Later that year, MCA Records crossed over into its parent company, Geffen Records. Many of the artists on its roster were let go, including N-Toon.

Discography

Album

Singles

References

American boy bands
Musical quartets
Musical groups established in 1996
Musical groups disestablished in 2000
Musical groups from Georgia (U.S. state)